Jennifer Ward (born October 8, 1957) is a Canadian broadcast journalist, and an anchor with CTV News Channel since 1999.

Ward joined Toronto's CFTO in August 1988 as a reporter and was promoted to news anchor in September.  She then moved to Philadelphia, Pennsylvania, U.S. in July 1991 to become anchor and reporter for KYW-TV.  In this role she worked as the first solo female anchor for the evening news in Philadelphia.  Five years later she moved to co-host Fox Television's morning program Good Day Philadelphia, which lasted until 1999.  In this role, she won two Emmys.

, she works as a news anchor for the national cable channel CTV News Channel and CTV's Canada AM.  Ward is the morning weekend anchor on CTV News Channel, as well as a regular anchor on Canada AM.

References 

Canadian television news anchors
Living people
Canadian television reporters and correspondents
1957 births
Canadian women television journalists
20th-century Canadian journalists
21st-century Canadian journalists
20th-century Canadian women